Olga Karina Jelinek (born 22 March 1981) is an Argentine model, actress and television personality.

Biography
Jelinek was born on 22 March 1981 in Villa María, Córdoba. She began to work as model at the age of 16, and became the Miss Córdoba Province and the Miss Villa Carlos Paz. At the age of 19, she moved to Buenos Aires, and began participating in fashion shows, advertising campaigns and television shows. She has appeared for magazines Maxim and H Para Hombres and other media. In 2004, she participated in the entertainment TV program No hay 2 sin 3.

In 2005, she took part in the dance competition Bailando por un sueño, a segment of the television program Showmatch in the Argentina broadcast El Trece.

After a courtship of three months she married Leonardo Fariña on 28 April 2011 in the Tattersall hotel in the Palermo district of Buenos Aires.

In 2012, she again took part in the Bailando por un sueño competition.
In 2013, the name of her husband Fariña appeared in the media in relation to a clandestine recording of him reportedly speaking of money laundering.  In May of that year they stopped living together.

In 2020, Jelinek became a contestant in the renewed version of Cantando por un sueño. In August 2020, Jelinek revealed she is in a relationship with model Florencia Parise, and stated she feels attraction for both men and women, saying "I can't choose with whom I fall in love".

Filmography

Film

Television

References

External links
 
 Karina Jelinek (official site)

1981 births
21st-century Argentine women
Argentine female models
Argentine television personalities
Argentine vedettes
Bailando por un Sueño (Argentine TV series) participants
Argentine LGBT actors
LGBT models
Living people
Participants in Argentine reality television series
People from Villa María
Women television personalities